Phi Centauri, Latinized from φ Centauri, is a blue-white hued star in the southern constellation Centaurus. It is visible to the naked eye with an apparent visual magnitude of +3.7. The annual parallax shift is 6.21 mas as measured from Earth, which yields a distance estimate of around 530 light years. It is moving further from the Sun with a radial velocity of +5 km/s.

This is a B-type subgiant star with a stellar classification of B2 IV. It has no known companions, but does show radial velocity variations and higher order pulsations in the spectrum. The star is just 18 million years old with 8.5 times the mass of the Sun and has 4.2 times the Sun's radius. It is radiating around 4,000 times the Sun's luminosity from its photosphere at an effective temperature of about 21,638 K.

This star is a proper motion member of the Upper Centaurus–Lupus sub-group in the
Scorpius–Centaurus OB association, the nearest such co-moving association of massive stars to the Sun.

References

B-type subgiants
Upper Centaurus Lupus
Centaurus (constellation)
Centauri, Phi
Durchmusterung objects
068245
121743
5248